Smokey & Miho was a musical group named after lead vocalists Miho Hatori and Smokey Hormel.  Hatori collaborated with Hormel after leaving the group Cibo Matto. The group released two EPs and later released a compilation album, The Two EPs, which was composed of the two previously released EPs.

Band information
 Miho Hatori: Vocals
 Smokey Hormel: Guitars, Vocals
 Jon Birdsong: Horns
 Don Falzone: Bass
 Joey Waronker: Drums
 Mauro Refosco: Percussion
 Ganda: Vocals

Discography

EPs
Smokey & Miho (2002)
Tempo De Amor (2002)

Compilation
The Two EPs (2003) 
(Vinyl re-release on Varèse Sarabande 2017)

References

American Latin musical groups